Radio23 was a non-commercial, freeform radio station founded by Programming Director Jeff Hylton Simmons and launched in 2009. It was shut down in July 2015. The successor called Freeform Portland went on air in April 2016. Based out of Portland, Oregon, where it supported the local artists and community, the station's goal was to provide an international artistic platform for home broadcasters around the world, and to teach anyone around the world how to create radio with a computer and an internet connection.  Radio23 is connected with radio stations that include Cascade Community Radio, Hearth Music, WFMU, KDVS, CKUT-FM, KZME, KBOO, Error FM, and Willamette Radio, and also with the magazine War, Semen and Grooviness.

Events 

Since its official launch in May 2009, Radio 23 covered many festivals; some of these include the Primavera Festival, NYC's No Fun Fest, PDX Pop Now!, Lockstock, North Side Festival, the Portland Institute for Contemporary Art's Time-Based Art Festival, and Eye & Ear Fest. Radio23's shows include Cinema Terrorisme, Ola's Kool Kitchen and Nine 11 Thesaurus.

Programming 

Radio23's programming included types of popular music that include rock, indie, jazz, folk, R&B, experimental music, and hip-hop. It also featured band interviews and live broadcasts.

See also 
 WKEntertainment
 WFMU
 List of Internet radio stations
 Freeform Portland

References

External links 
 Radio 23
 Radio 23 Mirror
 WFMU-FM 91.1/Jersey City, NJ; 90.1/Hudson Valley, NY
 Interview with Jeff Hylton Simmons on KBOO Radio

Mass media in Portland, Oregon
Internet radio stations in the United States
Internet properties established in 2009
2009 establishments in Oregon
Freeform radio stations
2015 disestablishments in Oregon
Internet properties disestablished in 2015
Defunct radio stations in the United States
Defunct mass media in Oregon